Janet McAdams (born 1957) is an American poet, who wrote The Island of Lost Luggage (University of Arizona Press) which received an American Book Award in 2001 and the First Book Award for Poetry from the Native Writers' Circle of the Americas in 1999. She is also the editor of Salt Publishing's Earthworks Series of Native poets.  In addition, she's worked as a telephone operator, a cartographer, a camp counselor, a maid, a cook, and an exercise instructor for people with developmental disabilities.

Background and education 
Janet McAdams claims to be of Alabama Creek, Scottish, and Irish ancestry. She received her MFA in creative writing from the University of Alabama and her PhD in comparative literature from Emory University, where her studies focused on American Indian poetry. She has taught literature and creative writing at the University of Alabama, the American School of El Salvador, the University of Oklahoma, and is presently the Robert P. Hubbard Professor of Poetry at Kenyon College.

Writing career 
Her first novel, Red Weather, is about a Native American's trip to a small Central American country in search of her activist parents.

Works 
 The Island of Lost Luggage, University of Arizona Press. 2000. 
 Feral, Salt Publishing. 2007 
 Red Weather, (University of Arizona Press, 2012

See also

 Poetry

References

External links
 Janet McAdams, Kenyon College
 Janet McAdams, Poetry Foundation
 "The Island of Lost Luggage"
 Janet McAdams, Hanksville
 Salt Publishing's Earthworks Series
 Janet McAdams poems

American people who self-identify as being of Native American descent
Kenyon College faculty
1957 births
Living people
American women poets
20th-century American poets
20th-century American women writers
American Book Award winners
American women academics
21st-century American women